Jean-Christophe Fromantin (born August 30, 1962 in Nantes), is a French businessman and politician. He has been Mayor of Neuilly-sur-Seine since 2008.

After launching the party Territoires en mouvement, he was elected deputy for the sixth district of Hauts-de-Seine in 2012. He did not seek re-election in 2017, preferring to keep his mandate as mayor. Elected to the Hauts-de-Seine departmental council in 2021, he became vice-president.

Biography

Studies and Family 
Jean-Christophe Fromantin studied at various schools in Saintes, Dunkerque and Strasbourg, where he obtained his baccalaureate in 1981. After a year of economics and another in a preparatory class, he entered ESLSCA in Paris and graduated in 1986.

In 2015, he became a reserve officer (frigate captain) in the French Navy.

Married he had four children.

He lives in Neuilly-sur-Seine since 1985.

Professional career path 
Between 1987 and 1988, he did his national service as a volunteer in Lisbon. On his return in 1989, he created Eurochallenge, a service and consulting company for import-export. Concerned observer of globalization, he has given numerous conferences on innovation and the search for new forms of competitiveness in companies.

Following the merge with Interex in 1994, he took over the management of the newly created company, Export Entreprises, which participated in 2009 in the launch of Globaltrade.net, a public-private partnership between the U.S. Department of Commerce and the Federation of International Trade Associations (FITA).

He is known for opposing gay marriage and promoting a French candidacy to the 2025 World's fair.

References

1962 births
Living people
Mayors of places in Île-de-France
Businesspeople from Nantes
People from Neuilly-sur-Seine
Deputies of the 14th National Assembly of the French Fifth Republic
Union of Democrats and Independents politicians
Politicians from Nantes